Mogadiscio Municipality is a Somali football club based in Mogadishu, Somalia which currently plays in Somali Second Division the second division of Somali Football.

In 1975 the team has won the Somalia League.

Stadium 
Currently the team plays at the 15000 capacity Banadir Stadium.

Honours
 Somalia League: 1976, 1986, 1989

References

External links
 

Football clubs in Somalia
Sport in Mogadishu